The 1948–49 Greek Football Cup was the seventh edition of the Greek Football Cup. The competition culminated with the Greek Cup Final, replayed at Leoforos Alexandras Stadium, on 3 July 1949, because of the previous match (19 June) draw. The match was contested by AEK Athens and Panathinaikos, with AEK Athens winning by 2–1 after extra time.

Calendar

Qualification round

First round

|-
|colspan="5" style="background-color:#D0D0D0" align=center|Central Greece/Islands Football Clubs Association
||colspan="2" rowspan="12" 

||colspan="2" rowspan="10" 

|}

Second round

|-
|colspan="5" style="background-color:#D0D0D0" align=center|Central Greece/Islands Football Clubs Association
||colspan="2" rowspan="4" 

||colspan="2" rowspan="5" 

||colspan="2" rowspan="3" 

|-
|colspan="5" style="background-color:#D0D0D0" align=center|Crete Football Clubs Association
||colspan="2" rowspan="2" 

|-
|colspan="5" style="background-color:#D0D0D0" align=center|Patras/Western Greece Football Clubs Association
||colspan="2" rowspan="5" 

|-
|colspan="5" style="background-color:#D0D0D0" align=center|Thessaly Football Clubs Association
||colspan="2" rowspan="3" 

|-
|colspan="5" style="background-color:#D0D0D0" align=center|Thessaloniki Football Clubs Association
||colspan="2" rowspan="6" 

|-
|colspan="5" style="background-color:#D0D0D0" align=center|Eastern Macedonia Football Clubs Association
||colspan="2" rowspan="6" 

|}

*Ethnikos was zeroed due to late arrival in the match. A friendly match against Ionikos Asteras Thiva took place instead that ended 3–7.

Third round

|-
|colspan="5" style="background-color:#D0D0D0" align=center|Central Greece/Islands Football Clubs Association
||colspan="2" rowspan="2" 

|-
|colspan="5" style="background-color:#D0D0D0" align=center|Crete Football Clubs Association
||colspan="2" 
|-
|colspan="5" style="background-color:#D0D0D0" align=center|Patras/Western Greece Football Clubs Association
||colspan="2" rowspan="2" 

||colspan="2" rowspan="2" 

|-
|colspan="5" style="background-color:#D0D0D0" align=center|Thessaly Football Clubs Association
||colspan="2" rowspan="5" 

|-
|colspan="5" style="background-color:#D0D0D0" align=center|Eastern Macedonia Football Clubs Association
||colspan="2" rowspan="2" 

||colspan="2" 
|}

* Olympiacos Corinth won the match by, 2–3 but was zeroed due to illegal usage of football players.

**Suspended due to the withdrawal of Ionikos Astaras Thiva.

Additional round

|-
|colspan="5" style="background-color:#D0D0D0" align=center|Central Greece/Islands Football Clubs Association
||colspan="2" 
|-
|colspan="5" style="background-color:#D0D0D0" align=center|Crete Football Clubs Association
||colspan="2" 
|-
|colspan="5" style="background-color:#D0D0D0" align=center|Patras/Western Greece Football Clubs Association
||colspan="2" 
|-
|colspan="5" style="background-color:#D0D0D0" align=center|Thessaly Football Clubs Association
||colspan="2" 

|-
|colspan="5" style="background-color:#D0D0D0" align=center|Thessaloniki Football Clubs Association
||colspan="2" rowspan="4" 

|}

* Aris Thiva resigned.

Fourth round

|-
|colspan="5" style="background-color:#D0D0D0" align=center|Central Greece/Islands Football Clubs Association
||colspan="2" 

|-
|colspan="5" style="background-color:#D0D0D0" align=center|Crete Football Clubs Association
||colspan="2" rowspan="2" 

|-
|colspan="5" style="background-color:#D0D0D0" align=center|Patras/Western Greece Football Clubs Association
||colspan="2" 
|-
|colspan="5" style="background-color:#D0D0D0" align=center|Thessaly Football Clubs Association
||colspan="2" rowspan="2" 

|-
|colspan="5" style="background-color:#D0D0D0" align=center|Thessaloniki Football Clubs Association
||colspan="2" 
|-
|colspan="5" style="background-color:#D0D0D0" align=center|Eastern Macedonia Football Clubs Association
||colspan="2" rowspan="3" 

|}

Fifth round

|-
|colspan="5" style="background-color:#D0D0D0" align=center|Central Greece/Islands Football Clubs Association
||colspan="2" rowspan="4" 

|-
|colspan="5" style="background-color:#D0D0D0" align=center|Patras/Western Greece Football Clubs Association
||colspan="2" rowspan="2" 

||colspan="2" 
|-
|colspan="5" style="background-color:#D0D0D0" align=center|Thessaly Football Clubs Association
||colspan="2" 

|-
|colspan="5" style="background-color:#D0D0D0" align=center|Eastern Macedonia Football Clubs Association
||colspan="2" rowspan="2" 

|}

*Panthivaikos left the match at the 85th minute, after they conceided the second goal.

Sixth round

|-
|colspan="3" style="background-color:#D0D0D0" align=center|Central Greece/Islands Football Clubs Association

|-
|colspan="3" style="background-color:#D0D0D0" align=center|Patras/Western Greece Football Clubs Association

|-
|colspan="3" style="background-color:#D0D0D0" align=center|Thessaly Football Clubs Association

|-
|colspan="3" style="background-color:#D0D0D0" align=center|Thessaloniki Football Clubs Association

|}

Seventh round

|-
|colspan="3" style="background-color:#D0D0D0" align=center|Central Greece/Islands Football Clubs Association

|-
|colspan="3" style="background-color:#D0D0D0" align=center|Crete Greece Football Clubs Association

|-
|colspan="3" style="background-color:#D0D0D0" align=center|Thessaly Football Clubs Association

|-
|colspan="3" style="background-color:#D0D0D0" align=center|Thessaloniki Football Clubs Association

|-
|colspan="3" style="background-color:#D0D0D0" align=center|Eastern Macedonia Football Clubs Association

|}

Eighth round

|-
|colspan="5" style="background-color:#D0D0D0" align=center|Patras Football Clubs Association

||colspan="2" 
|-
|colspan="5" style="background-color:#D0D0D0" align=center|Thessaly Football Clubs Association
||colspan="2" 
|}

Knockout phase
In the knockout phase, teams play against each other over a single match. If the match ends up as a draw, extra time will be played and if the match remains a draw a replay match is set at the home of the guest team which the extra time rule stands as well. That procedure will be repeated until a winner occurs. The mechanism of the draws for each round is as follows:
In the draw for the round of 16, the eight top teams of each association are seeded and the eight clubs that passed the qualification round are unseeded.The seeded teams are drawn against the unseeded teams with the exception of 2 draws.
In the draws for the quarter-finals onwards, there are no seedings, and teams from the same group can be drawn against each other.

Bracket

Round of 16

||colspan="2" rowspan="7" 

|}

Quarter-finals

||colspan="2" rowspan="3" 

|}

Semi-finals

|}

Final

The 7th Greek Cup Final was played twice at the Leoforos Alexandras Stadium.

The match was abandoned at the 109 minute.

Replay match

References

External links
Greek Cup 1948-49 at RSSSF

Greek Football Cup seasons
Greek Cup
1948–49 in Greek football